K. V. Saravanan, better known as Saran, is an Indian film director active mainly in Tamil cinema. He was once an assistant to K. Balachander. He owns production house called Gemini Productions.

Early life

Saran's father T. Kulandaivelayudam worked with the directorate of examinations and many of his relatives are teachers. He finished diploma in visual communications from the College of Arts And Crafts and became an instructor in textile designing. Saran worked as instructor for a year and, during this time, he did some work with a lady called Mohana who was art director for K. Balachander. KB was the director whom Saran admired above all others. Saran hoped this relationship would be the key to get to him. He joined as an assistant director to KB when he was making Pudhu Pudhu Arthangal (1989).

By then, Saran was also a cartoonist for Ananda Vikatan. He would do this work at two in the morning, sleep for a bit and get back to work with KB by 7 am. Finally, Sarann gave up working as a cartoonist because assisting KB was too demanding. And then, Sarann's first film happened. He describes that he "was wondering what would happen if a girl, who is engaged to a particular person, falls in love with someone else" and this formed the basis of his plot for his first film Kadhal Mannan (1998). The film saw veteran music composer M. S. Viswanathan make his acting debut in a supporting role, whilst the lead actress Maanu from Assam and music composer Bharadwaj also debuted. The film's soundtrack gained rave review prior to release. Viswanathan had initially waded away the approach but actor Vivek later convinced him to partake in the film. The film won positive reviews from critics, with a reviewer praising the film for tackling a taboo subject. The critic claimed that Ajith Kumar "was back at his best", whilst also crediting success to Maanu's performance and Bharadwaj's soundtrack. The film received a good response at the box office. The first copy was worth Rs 22 million, but was only sold for Rs 16 million. Despite all this, it ran 100 days and re-established Ajith Kumar's market after a string of failures. The producers of the previous collaboration of Ajith Kumar and Sarann during Kadhal Mannan, Venkateswaralayam had lost a lot of money on that film so Ajith insisted on doing another film for the studio, Amarkalam (1999). Sarann initially approached Shalini, who was studying at the time and she refused but after a three-month pursuit, he finally got her to sign on as well. The role of Tulasi Das was initially offered to Amitabh Bachchan who accepted before later pulling out of the film. The film began production in January 1999 and during the production of the film, the lead pair Ajith Kumar and Shalini fell in love and eventually got married in April 2000. The film won predominantly positive reviews upon release with a reviewer describing the film as having an "okay storyline made very good because of its brilliant execution" whilst stating that the "climax is also very well-developed" and praising the performance of Ajith Kumar. The film went on to become a large commercial success at the box office, extending the lead actor Ajith Kumar's success after his previous film Vaali. Ajith went on to purchase Sarann a car as a token of gratitude for the success.

His next film was Parthen Rasithen (2000) with Prashanth and Simran (their third time pair after successful hits such as Kannedhirey Thondrinal and Jodi). which did well at the box office and Simran's performance was well praised by critics (her first Villainous role).

But his next film Alli Arjuna (2002) was a flop in spite of a r rahman's compositions. Then he directed a film for Vikram in a production under AVM Productions in Gemini (2002), it became a mass success at the time, it made Vikram very popular and one of the hit film, Ajith neglect to act because of his Racing Career Then he directed Jay Jay (2003) with Madhavan which was a hit. After Jay Jay, Saran works for the first time with Kamal Haasan in Vasool Raja MBBS (2004) which was a remake of the Hindi film Munna Bhai M.B.B.S.. The film received positive reviews and was a commercial success. His next film is again with Ajith in Attahasam (2004) also this film became a commercial success. After this films Saran directed Idhaya Thirudan (2006) with Jayam Ravi and was produced by veteran Director K. Balachander, The film received mixed reviews and was later considered a flop at the Box-office. His next venture is Vattaram with Arya the film received positive reviews and was a hit at the box office.

In early 2007, Saran agreed terms to direct his second film with Kamal Haasan in the lead role, while also taking up the role of producer. Saran later sold the production rights of the move to Ayngaran International, a move which irked Kamal Haasan and his team. As a result, the actor opted out and the film was shelved. Later he directed Modhi Vilayadu (2009) starring Vinay Rai and Kajal Aggarwal, the film was released to mixed reviews and fared poorly at the box office. His next film is Aasal in which film Saran works once again with Ajith met with mixed reviews upon release but was an average at the box-office.

His next movie Aayirathil Iruvar starring Vinay Rai released in September 2017. His movie  Market Raja MBBS with Arav was released in 2019.

Personal life
Saran and his wife Subha have two kids Sanjanaa and Sanjith. His younger brother K. V. Guhan works as cinematographer in Tamil film industry.

Filmography

References

External links
 Saran at the Society Promoting Indian Cinematic Entertainment

People from Coimbatore
Living people
Indian film directors
Tamil film directors
Telugu film directors
Film directors from Tamil Nadu
Tamil screenwriters
Screenwriters from Tamil Nadu
21st-century Indian dramatists and playwrights
20th-century Indian dramatists and playwrights
20th-century Indian film directors
21st-century Indian film directors
1966 births